Gul Agha Sherzai, also known as Mohammad Shafiq, is a politician in Afghanistan. He is the former governor of Nangarhar province in eastern Afghanistan. He previously served as Governor of Kandahar province, in the early 1990s and from 2001 until 2003. In October 2013, Sherzai resigned from his post as governor and formally announced himself as a candidate for Afghanistan's 2014 Presidential Election, and served as the minister of border and tribal affairs until the Taliban victory in 2021.

Early years
 Sherzai was born in 1954 in the Barakzai area of Kandahar province. His father was Haji Abdul Latif, proprietor at a small tea shop in Kandahar who rose to become a famous Mujahideen commander. Sherzai took the name Gul Agha when he joined his father in the Mujahideen, who were fighting in the southern Afghanistan area against the Soviet invasion.

His father was later murdered and he added Sherzai (Pashto for "son of lion") as his last name. He is an ethnic Pashtun from the Barakzai tribe. His father was locally known as Haji Latif Sagwan, ("Sagwan" is a term used for a "dog fighter") which is a derogatory term used for gamblers, who was a well known dog fighter in southern Afghanistan. After the collapse of the PDPA government in 1992, Sherzai served as Governor of Kandahar. He was known outside of Afghanistan as one of the major warlords until around September 1994 when the Taliban began their conquest in Kandahar. Sherzai resigned from his post as governor and remained hidden until late 2001 in Pakistan.

The Karzai administration
Sherzai's capture of Kandahar in late 2001, with assistance from American special forces and Hamid Karzai, marked the first time territory in southern Afghanistan had been captured from the Taliban forces.

According to Matthieu Aikins, writing in Harper's Magazine Karzai appointed a Mullah Naqib to the Governorship of Kandarhar. Aikins reported that American officials favored Sherzai over Karzai's choice, and encouraged him to oust Mullah Naqib.

In August 2003, Afghan President Karzai decreed that officials could no longer hold both military and civil posts, and replaced Sherzai with Yousef Pashtun as Governor of Kandahar.

Political career after Kandahar
In 2004, Sherzai was appointed Governor of Nangarhar Province, after a spell as "Special Advisor" to Hamid Karzai. 

In July 2006, Sherzai narrowly escaped an assassination attempt at a funeral outside Jalalabad. The attempt killed five police officers and wounded several more people, including some children. He opened the newly built highway connecting Jalalabad city with Torkham, which is one of the most popular border towns between Afghanistan and Pakistan. Afghan President Karzai and Pakistan's Prime Minister Shaukat Aziz were also present during the inauguration.

In 2008 he met Barack Obama.

In January 2009, an article by Ahmad Majidyar of the American Enterprise Institute included Sherzai on a list of fifteen possible candidates in the 2009 Afghan Presidential election. In May 2009, he announced that he would not be a candidate. Nevertheless, his name was on an August 2009 ballot, and preliminary results placed him 17th in a field of 38.

Sherzai's brother is Abdul Raziq Sherzai, a commander who captured Kandahar airfield in 2001-02 and was subsequently made the Kandahar wing commander of the Afghan Air Force.

On October 2, 2013, Sherzai resigned from his post as Governor of Nangarhar Province and formally announced himself as a candidate for Afghanistan's 2014 Presidential Election.

References

External links

BBC News - Afghanistan's Powerbrokers (Gul Agha Sherzai)
Profile: Gul Agha Sherzai

Living people
Mujahideen members of the Soviet–Afghan War
Politics of Nangarhar Province
Governors of Kandahar Province
Governors of Nangarhar Province
Pashtun people
1954 births
People from Kandahar